Siphonognathus is a genus of ray-finned fishes,  weed whitings in the family Odacidae which are endemic to Southern Australian coastal waters. These fish are characterized by their extremely elongate bodies and live primarily in seagrass beds.

Species
There are currently six recognized species in this genus:
 Siphonognathus argyrophanes J. Richardson, 1858 (Tubemouth)
 Siphonognathus attenuatus (J. D. Ogilby, 1897) (Slender weed whiting)
 Siphonognathus beddomei (R. M. Johnston, 1885) (Pencil weed whiting)
 Siphonognathus caninis (J. K. Scott, 1976) (Sharpnose weed whiting)
 Siphonognathus radiatus (Quoy & Gaimard, 1834) (Long-rayed weed whiting)
 Siphonognathus tanyourus M. F. Gomon & Paxton, 1986 (Longtail weed whiting)

Although Fishbase places all six of these species in the genus Siphonognathus, the Catalog of Fishes places S. attentuatus, S. beddomei, S. radiatus and S. tanyourus in the separate genus Sheardichthys and places S. caninis on the monospecific genus Parodax, leaving Siphonognathus as a monospecific genus containing only the tubemouth (S. argyrophanes).

References

Odacidae
Marine fish genera
Taxa named by John Richardson (naturalist)